The Dallas mayoral election of 2007 took place on May 12, 2007, to elect the successor to incumbent Mayor Laura Miller. Miller decided not to run for a second full term. The race is officially nonpartisan. After no candidate received a majority of the votes, the top two candidates - Tom Leppert and Ed Oakley - faced each other in a runoff election on June 16, 2007 in which Leppert prevailed.

Candidates
John Cappello - small businessman
Sam Coats - former member of the Texas House of Representatives and CEO of Schlotzsky's
Jennifer Gale - homeless activist and five time candidate for Mayor of Austin (
Gary Griffith - two term City Councilman from District 09 (East Dallas)
Roger Herrera - lawyer
Don Hill - four term City Councilman from District 05 (South Dallas)
Darrell Jordan - lawyer and candidate for Mayor of Dallas in 1995
Tom Leppert - former CEO of Turner Construction
Ed Oakley - three term City Councilman from District 03 (Oak Cliff)
Edward Okpa - real estate appraiser and candidate for Mayor of Dallas in 2003

Results

General election

Runoff results

References

Dallas mayoral
Dallas
2007
Non-partisan elections
2000s in Dallas